Sarvepalli is a village in Nellore district of Andhra Pradesh, India and famous for being the ancestral village of former Indian President Sarvepalli Radhakrishnan.

Assembly constituency
Sarvepalli is an assembly constituency in Andhra Pradesh.

List of Elected Members:
1955 - Vangallu Kodandarami Reddy
1962 - V Venku Reddy
1967 - Swarna Vemiah
1972 - Mangalagiri Nanadas
1983 - Pechalareddy Chenna Reddy
1978 - Chitturu Venkata Sesha Reddy
1985 - Eduru Ramakrishna Reddy
1989 - Chitturu Venkata Sesha Reddy
1994 - Somireddy Chandra Mohana Reddy - TDP
1999 - Somireddy Chandra Mohana Reddy - TDP
2004 - Adala Prabhakar Reddy - Congress
2009 - Adala Prabhakar Reddy - Congress
2014 - Kakani Govardhan Reddy - YSRCP

References

External links
 " Dr. Sarvepalli Radhakrishnan. Com"

Villages in Nellore district